Frans Cuyck Van Myerop (ca. 1640, Bruges – 1689, Ghent), was a Flemish Baroque painter.

Biography
He was born in Bruges. In 1665 he became a member of the Guild of St. Luke in Ghent, where he served as deacon from 1679 to 1685. He signed his works with the monogram FVM. Robert van Audenaerd was his pupil.

He is known for his hunting still lifes, trompe-l'oeil still lifes, fruit still lifes, fish still lifes and group portraits.

References

Frans Cuyck Van Myerop on Artnet

1640 births
1689 deaths
Flemish Baroque painters
Flemish still life painters
Artists from Bruges
Painters from Ghent